Gayant the giant is an iconic processional puppet of Douai. Each year for three days at the beginning of July, the Gayant festival takes place. During the festival, Gayant and his entire family are carried through the city. On Sunday the largest procession starts from the town hall.
Gayant is registered with the Masterpieces of the Oral and Intangible Heritage of Humanity as an example of Processional giants and dragons in Belgium and France.

Gayant family 
The Gayant family members are Gayant himself, his wife Marie Cagenon, and their three children: Jacquot, Fillon, and Binbin.

Today the giant family is the result of successive construction/rebuilding sessions ('NR'), restorations  ('R'), and "disappearances" ('D'). The dates  
of the first representations were independent of/to each other, the main dates are:
 For Gayant: 1530 (NR), 1690 (R), 1692 (NR), 1700  (R), 1703 (NR), 1712 (NR), 1716 (R), 1719 (R), 1723 (R), 1724 (R), 1734 (R), 1741 (R), 1779 [2], 1785 (NR), 1792 (D), 1801 (NR), 1809 (R), 1823 (NR)
 For Marie-Cagenon: 1531 (NR), 1712 (R),
1714 (NR), 1719 (R), 1792 (D), 1801 (NR), 1823 (NR) 
 For Jacquot: 1675 (NR), 1719 (R), 1724 (R), 1741 (R), 1780 (R), 1792 (D), 1801 (NR), 1809 (R), 1827 (NR)
 For Fillon: 1678 (NR), 1724 (R), 1741 (R), 1782 (R), 1792 (D), 1801 (NR), 1809 (R), 1827 (NR)
 For Binbin: 1715 (NR), 1719 (R), 1724 (R), 1741 (R), 1780 (R), 1792 (D), 1801 (NR), 1809 (R), 1827 (NR)
Since 1827, the operations of restorations or rebuildings of the whole of the family have been coordinated. The main dates are 1859, 1867, 1874, 1881, 1885, 1892, 1912, 1922, 1947, and 1954.
Each year, the mannequins, which are constructed of wicker are cleaned and restored to avoid heavy reworks.

Unlike other cities, Douai did not give a name to its giant; it is simply called "Gayant", i.e. "giant" in the language of Picardy which was in use in Douai at the time of the original festival. 
This absence of a name for the giant poses the question of how best to personify the giant.

Who is Gayant?

Jehan Gelon 
According to local legend, at the end of the 9th century, the townsmen of the banks of the Scarpe, in fear of the cruel attacks of barbarians, came to ask the lord of Cantin, Jehan Gelon, to help them if the city were attacked. Gelon, known for his Herculean strength and his kindness, accepted, advising them to take refuge in the tower and to expect him in the event of an attack. 

When the city was besieged by the Normans, Jehan Gelon, accompanied by his three sons, arrived miraculously in the city (explained later by the fact that a tunnel connected the tower to his castle), and undertook the counter-attack. It took great courage and determination to repel the attackers who, while leaving, destroyed his castle and massacred the women there. Jehan and his sons decided to go to war to try to forget the loss of their families. According to legend, Gelon died close to Bavay. The legend has it that the inhabitants of Douai, in remembering his acts of bravery, made him a giant—the symbol of the city.

The Giant, Maloré and Morant 
An episode of La Belle Hélène de Constantinople, a famous epic of the 14th century with prolonged popular success, takes place between Douai and Cantin. Morant and his army ineffectively besiege the tower of the Giant, the perfidious and heathen vassal situated in Douai. This tower is linked by an underground passage with Cantin, where sat the giant Maloré, the brother of the giant of Douai. Morant decides to take the tower of Cantin, more vulnerable than the fortress of the Giant. The latter rushes to Cantin to help his brother. But Morant takes bulwarks, kills the Giant, and releases Douai and Cantin from the heathen.

Jean Wauquelin (1452 +) put this epic in prose for the Duke of Burgundy Philip the Good in 1448.

Saint Maurand 
Many historians reject the legend of Jean Gelon and prefer to see it as the city's homage to Saint Maurand. Two stories exist about the appearance of Saint Maurand in a dream, preventing the capture of the city by the French. 
   
The most usually allowed is this:
"In 1479, the French threatened the town of Douai, then Burgundian. In the small hours of 16 June 1479, the day of St. Maurand, French troops tried to penetrate the city by the Door of Arras. The gatekeeper gave the alarm and thus saved the city. The gatekeeper declared that the saint had prevented it in his dream; the relics of the saint, stored in the church of Sacré-Coeur were then paraded through the city."

The second story says that the procession of the giant had already begun, so the identification with the Saint came later. 
"In 1556, Saint Maurand appeared in a dream to the guard of the church of Sacré-Coeur and ordered him to sound the matins. The inhabitants woke, armed themselves, and went to the ramparts where they saw a "knight of Light" come to fight alone against the troops of Gaspard de Coligny which besieged the city. This knight was recognised as Saint Maurand, and since then "the gigantic mannequin of wicker took the shape and the features of the "knight of Light" "

A child raised by a she-bear and other stories…
In the 19th century, several accounts in the form of tales or plays take a Gayant-like character and reinvent his history. "Intrepid Gayant", one of the "Tales of King Cambrinus" written by Charles Deulin remains best known nowadays: the giant of Douai becomes a wild child brought up by a she-bear which takes it for one of her own because of his breadth and his bear-like strength. A logger finds him, adopts him and the child becomes an adult, achieving many exploits thanks to his size, his strength, and intelligence.

Description 
The giant has had his current form since 1954. The earliest description dates to 1530  and describes the character as twenty-two feet tall, wearing the costume of a feudal man of war (in medieval armour with gloved hands). The mannequin was created by the corporation of the Manneliers. Until 1598, only one carrier was needed  to move it. In 1665 it needed five carriers for the  wicker mannequin. The appearance of the giant is no longer the same. The helmet has been removed, and he wears a wig. The lance has been replaced by a war hammer. The Sabre appeared beside the body in 1700. In 1703, during the construction of the new Gayant, the painter Martin Saint Leger was charged to carry out the specific colours for each giant. The helmet was reinstated, and then between 1724 and 1741 the giant wore a cap of rabbit fur.
Absent from 1792 to 1801, (?) its return is marked by the will to equip Gayant with the fashion of the day (Consulate). In 1823, the feudal style returned. The painter Wallet then draws corresponding clothing of the time of Francis the Ist. In fact, the sketches of Wallet  were used as the model for all the restorations, although in 1827 a cotton coat was added, as well as a streamer of scarlet serge on the upper part of the lance.

Footnotes

Documentaries 
The Gayant are the stars of the documentary "Giant!" by Thomas Deshays, released in France on March 21, 2018.

Bibliography

General books 
 René Darré, Géants d'hier et d'aujourd'hui, 90 p.
 Claude Malbranke, Guide de Flandre et Artois mystérieux, p. 92-96, éditions Presse Pocket, 1966.
 Robert Chaussois, Les Géants Du Nord-Pas-De-Calais, édition Téméraire, 1999, .
 Francis David, Claudine Le tourneur d'ison, Le réveil des Géants, édition Hoebeke, 2002.

Specific books 
 M. Quenson, Gayant ou le Géant de Douai, édition F.C. Houtland, 1991 (first edition, 1839).
 Marie-France Gueusquin, Monique Mestayer, Gayant, fêtes et géants de Douai, Béthune, Documents d'Ethnographie Régionale du Nord-Pas-de-Calais, no. 5, 1994.

Other links 
 Processional giants and dragons in Belgium and France
 Giant
 Masterpieces of the Oral and Intangible Heritage of Humanity

External links 
  Page on the site of the city hall of Douai about Gayant festival

European folklore
French culture
Nord-Pas-de-Calais
Giants in popular culture